The Norwegian Union of Telecommunication Workers (NTTF) was a trade union representing fitters and delivery workers at Televerket.

The union was founded in October 1930, as the Norwegian Telephone and Telegraph Union.  It affiliated to the Norwegian Confederation of Trade Unions, and by 1963, it had 8,047 members.

As of 1988, the union had 13,092 members.  In November, it merged with the Norwegian Telecommunication Organisation, to form the Norwegian Telecommunication and Data Workers' Union.

References

Telecommunications trade unions
Trade unions established in 1930
Trade unions disestablished in 1988
Defunct trade unions of Norway